The Athletics at the 2016 Summer Paralympics – Men's 400 metres T11 event at the 2016 Paralympic Games took place on 16–17 September 2016, at the Estádio Olímpico João Havelange.

Heats

Heat 1 
17:36 16 September 2016:

Heat 2 
17:42 16 September 2016:

Heat 3 
17:48 16 September 2016:

Final 
18:49 17 September 2016:

Notes

Athletics at the 2016 Summer Paralympics
2016 in men's athletics